SS Soesterberg was a Dutch-owned cargo steamship that was built in Belgium in 1927 and sunk by a U-boat in 1940 in the Battle of the Atlantic.

Building
Antwerp Engineering Co Ltd, of Hoboken built the ship, completing her in April 1927. Her owner was Stoomboot Mij Hillegersberg NV, who named her after the town of Soesterberg in the province of Utrecht, registered her in Amsterdam and appointed Vinke & Co of Rotterdam to manage her.

The boilers fed a three-cylinder triple expansion steam engine that was rated at 214 NHP and drove a single screw.

Wartime career
After the German invasion of the Netherlands in May 1940 Soesterberg remained in Allied service, making transatlantic crossings between Canada and Britain. In June 1940 she sailed in Convoy OB 174 from Liverpool to Halifax, Nova Scotia. In July she returned from Halifax to Liverpool in Convoy HX 59 with a cargo of pit props. Early in September she sailed with Convoy OA 208 from Methil in Scotland to Halifax. Early in October she sailed from Chatham, New Brunswick, carrying  of pit props bound for Hull. She went via Sydney, Nova Scotia, where she joined Convoy SC 7 bound for Liverpool.

Sinking
SC 7 left Sydney on 5 October. At first the convoy had only one escort ship, the  sloop . A wolf pack of U-boats found the convoy on 16 October and quickly overwhelmed it, sinking many ships over the next few days. Frauenheim followed this two minutes later with a stern torpedo. He hit two ships:  with a bow torpedo, and Soesterberg with the stern torpedo.

The explosion on Soesterberg blew four men overboard and wrecked her starboard lifeboat. The other survivors abandoned ship: three DEMS gunners on a liferaft, and the rest in the port lifeboat. A headcount showed that the men from the engine room were missing. The Master and the First Officer re-boarded the ship in search of them, but concluded they had been killed on watch below. The two officers then returned to the lifeboat.

The now abandoned Soesterberg remained afloat and drifting, as did the stricken Assyrian. Soesterberg collided with Assyrians stern, then suddenly turned upright. Shortly thereafter Soesterberg sank, spilling her cargo of pit props, several of which fell on survivors of the Assyrian. This wrecked most of their liferafts, but the survivors then clung to the floating pit props as they awaited rescue.

Six of the 25 men aboard Soesterberg had been killed. The  sloop  rescued the various survivors and landed them at Greenock.

References

 

1927 ships
Maritime incidents in October 1940
Ships built in Belgium
Ships sunk by German submarines in World War II
Steamships of the Netherlands
World War II merchant ships of the Netherlands
World War II shipwrecks in the Atlantic Ocean